Hygiella is a genus of flies in the family Tachinidae. The genus was originally placed in the tribe Blondeliini; however, Shima and Tachi (2016) assigned it to the tribe Acemyini.

Species
H. angustifrons Shima & Tachi, 2016
H. luteipes Shima & Tachi, 2016
H. nigripes Mesnil, 1968
H. proclinata Shima & Tachi, 2016
H. pygidialis Mesnil, 1957

References

Diptera of Asia
Exoristinae
Tachinidae genera